Hermon may refer to:

Places
Mount Hermon, a high mountain on the border between Syria and Lebanon
Hermon, Armenia

South Africa
 Hermon, South Africa

United States
Hermon, Los Angeles, California, a district of Los Angeles
Hermon, Maine, a town
Hermon High School
Hermon (town), New York
Hermon (village), New York, within the town of Hermon

Wales
Hermon, Anglesey
Hermon, Pembrokeshire
Hermon Chapel, Penrhiwceiber

Other uses
Hermon (name)
Battle of Mount Hermon (disambiguation)

See also
Herman (disambiguation)
Hermann (disambiguation)